Saint Joy is an unincorporated community in Buckingham County, in the U.S. state of Virginia.

Perry Hill was listed on the National Register of Historic Places in 1980.

References

Unincorporated communities in Virginia
Unincorporated communities in Buckingham County, Virginia